Motus (Latin for movement) is a network of radio receivers for tracking signals from transmitters attached to wild animals. Motus uses radio telemetry for real-time tracking. It was launched by Birds Canada in 2014 in the US and Canada.

By 2022, more than 1,500 receiver stations have been installed in 34 countries,  most receivers are concentrated in the United States and Canada, where the network began. Motus network has spread rapidly because it provides important key data useful to researchers and conservationists, both nationally and internationally.

The Motus transmitter's great advantage is that it has such a small size and weight, they can weigh ~0.2 grams to ~2.6 grams, and can therefore be attached to all animals, even small animals such as insects, for example a bee or a butterfly.

Once a researcher or organization receives state and federal permits, they only need to acquire the appropriate transmitters and attach them to their study objects, current transmitters' range (depending on size) is up to 12 miles (20 kilometers).

The long-used Geolocators and GPS loggers are light and small but only store the desired data, they cannot wirelessly transmit the data, this means that researchers must recapture the transmitter-equipped object to read the stored information, recapturing a wild animal can take a long time, and many times it does not succeed.

Depending on the animal to be tracked, the transmitter is attached in a suitable way, either with a thread or an adhesive, after a certain time the glue and thread dissolve and the transmitter falls off, having in the meantime transmitted all the data to the receivers it passed.

References

External links
 Schematic view of the motus system.
 Picture of a swallow fitted with a motus transmitter.

Radio technology